Roath Park Cardiff, Wales, is one of Cardiff's most popular parks, owned by Cardiff County Council and managed by the Parks Section. It retains a classic Victorian atmosphere and has many facilities. The park has recently been awarded the prestigious Green Flag award to recognise its high quality and its importance to Cardiff. Roath Park has widely diverse environments across the park.

It is a popular facility for fishing and rowing. There are four islands within a conservation area, home to many water birds. The main park includes a large playground, floral displays, the glasshouse conservatory and recreational areas.

Roath park occupies a long strip of land stretching from Cyncoed in the north to Roath towards the southeast.  The park is divided into several parts along the Roath Brook (or Nant Fawr/Nant y Lleuchi/Nant y Derwen Deg in Welsh).  From north to south, these divisions are: Wild Gardens, Roath Park Lake, Botanical Gardens, Rose Gardens, Pleasure Gardens, Roath Park Recreation Ground, Roath Brook Gardens, Roath Mill Gardens, Waterloo Gardens and the Sandies Open Space.

Two volunteer ‘Friends’ groups work with Cardiff Council to cover the full extent of the historic Roath Park. The Friends of Roath Park serve the northern section of the park as far as Penylan Hill. The south-eastern section of the park is served by the Friends of Penylan’s Gardens.

History 

A new park in the area, with a lake, was proposed in 1886, on land owned by Lord Tredegar. The land was covered with clay pits and also had a watermill which would need removing.

The land for Roath Park was donated to the city in 1887, primarily by the Marquis of Bute. The first section of the park was officially opened to the public in 1894 and it continued to be opened in sections over the following two decades. Work initially focused on creating the lake from an area of marshland. In 1915 a lighthouse was constructed in the lake containing a scale model of the 'Terra Nova' ship to commemorate Captain Scott's ill-fated voyage to the Antarctic from Cardiff in 1910. The park's atmosphere today still retains a Victorian and Edwardian character; the park itself is locally listed, and the surrounding streets are designated across three Conservation Areas to ensure this quality will be conserved. The park itself is listed Grade I on the Cadw/ICOMOS Register of Parks and Gardens of Special Historic Interest in Wales. Waterloo Gardens, Roath Mill Gardens and Roath Brook Gardens have a separate listing at Grade II.

In 2003, the park was used for filming for an episode of the TV series of The Story of Tracy Beaker. In 2019 the BBC reported that the lake had been polluted for several years by unauthorised sewage discharges.

Nature
There is a wide range of habitats in the park, which attracts a diverse variety of wildlife. The lake acts as an important habitat for over-wintering and breeding birds, including mallard, cormorants and herons. Four islands within the lake, which are inaccessible to the public, are safe nesting sites. The lake has a population of about 100 swans and a number of geese. Many wild birds are scared off by the abundance of geese in the lake, and local conservationists actively take measures to control their numbers. There is a wildflower garden included in the park where the area is managed to encourage wildlife and native species.

Trees 

The Tree Register of the British Isles, is an organisation which records and measures trees in the UK. The biggest and best of their kind are called Champion Trees; there are twelve of these in Roath Park.

There is a trail with marker posts to identify the following trees:
 Quercus bicolor (Swamp white oak)
 Ginkgo biloba 'Pendula, (Weeping maidenhair)
 Ulmus 'Sapporo autumn gold (Sapporo elm)
 Pterostyrax corymbosa
 Ilex macrocarpa
 Laurus nobilis 'Aurea''', (Golden bay)
 Meliosma parviflora Emmenopterys henryi Quercus x andegavennis Quercus pyrenaica, (Pyrenean oak)
 Malus 'Magdeburgensis, (Magdeburg apple)
 Pyrus calleryana 'Chanticleer (Callery pear)
 Maclura pomifera'', (Osage orange)

Two oak trees predate the establishment of the park and have been calculated to be about  years old.

Recreation 

Roath Park Recreation Ground, towards the southern end of the park, contains sports pitches available for many different activities such as football, baseball and rugby union. High quality bowling greens and tennis courts are provided in the central section of the park, the Pleasure Gardens. There are also rowing boats which can be hired out and used on the lake. The lake is also home to a local radio-controlled boat society and is used for coarse fishing throughout the year. There are also two well equipped playgrounds.

There was swimming on the lake from when the lake opened. Unfortunately, the public swim had to stop after concerns about impurity of the water were raised in 1949. The Taff Swim, the Long Distance Swimming Championship of Wales, continued until 1963. However there were water carnivals and water skiing still happening in the 1960s and 1970s.

Special events 
There are regular events within the park including guided walks, concerts, exhibitions etc.

Conservatory 

There is a glasshouse in Roath Park which was built in the 1970s, replacing two earlier ones from the early 1900s. It contains many unusual species of plants and trees such as palms, banana trees and orchids. A pond and waterfall form a central feature, containing fish, terrapins and whistling ducks. Swan and duck food is on sale for feeding the birds on the lake.

Ornamental gardens 
The park boasts exceptional floral displays. These include the flowerbeds along the promenade and the famous rose garden, which included trial beds for the National Rose Society.

Facilities 
A café adjacent to the lake is open most of the year and provides refreshments and light meals. A kiosk also serves refreshments
Toilets are provided within the park
The boat house hires rowing boats and other craft that use the lake.
A pavilion is provided for those using the bowling green and tennis courts.
Changing Rooms are provided for the sports pitches.

Nearby 
Roath Park is a long, fairly narrow park stretching from Roath into Cyncoed. The nearest district centre is at the southern end of the park on Wellfield Road and Albany Road.
Access is also good to other open spaces:
Nant Fawr Corridor. Lying to the North of the park and forming a 'green' corridor out to the open countryside.
Cathays Cemetery. Has a wealth of listed buildings and tombs.
Heath Park. Another large park, Heath provides numerous sports pitches for different types of sports and is home to several sporting teams.

See also
List of gardens in Wales

References

External links 
 

Tourist attractions in Cardiff
Parks in Cardiff
Gardens in Wales
Rose gardens in Wales
Roath
Registered historic parks and gardens in Cardiff
1894 establishments in Wales